Roberto Locatelli (born 5 July 1974) is a former Italian motorcycle rider who won the 125cc World Championship in 2000.

Locatelli was born in Bergamo. He started the 250cc World Championship of 2007 with a Gilera, but was severely injured in a practice session crash which caused him a broken leg and ankle and a concussion. He recovered in time to race two months later at Le Mans.

Career statistics

Grand Prix motorcycle racing

Races by year
(key) (Races in bold indicate pole position; races in italics indicate fastest lap)

References

1974 births
Living people
Sportspeople from Bergamo
Italian motorcycle racers
125cc World Championship riders
250cc World Championship riders